Ski jumping is a winter sport in which athletes compete on distance and style in a jump from a ski jumping hill. The sport has traditionally focused on a combination of style and distance, and it was therefore early seen as unimportant in many milieus to have the longest jump. The International Ski Federation (Fédération Internationale de Ski; FIS) has largely been opposed to the inflation in hill sizes and setting of distance records, and no world records have been set at Olympic, World Championship, Holmenkollen Ski Festival or Four Hills Tournament events, as these have never been among the largest hills in the world.

Since 1936, when the first jump beyond  was made, all world records in the sport have been made in the discipline of ski flying, an offshoot of ski jumping using larger hills where distance is explicitly emphasised. Two years prior, also in Vikersund, Dmitry Vassiliev reached  but fell upon landing; his jump is unofficially the longest ever made.

Ema Klinec (SLO) holds the current women's world record with 226 meters (741 ft) also set in Vikersund.

History
Ski jumping originated in Norway, and has been practiced since time immemorial, using handmade temporary hills. The first record is credited to Olaf Rye, a Norwegian-Danish soldier, who set up a show spectated by his fellow soldiers in 1808, on an improvised hill of handmade piled snow, reaching 9.4 metres (15 alen) in Eidsberg, Norway. This artificial small hill was built at Lekum gård (farm), a few hundred metres away from Eidsberg church.

Tim Ashburn says in his book The History of Ski Jumping that Norheim's longest jump on the circular track in Haugli ground in 1868 should have been measured at 9.4 metres alen but that newspapers in Christiania reported that the length "was a little exaggerated", so the official record is everywhere written as 19.5 m.

The sport quickly spread to Finland, the United States and Canada, where some of the subsequent records were set. Early jumping competitions were only scored by style, and it was seen as disruptive to attempt to jump further. Not until 1901 was a scoring system for distance introduced. With the construction of Bloudkova Velikanka in Planica, Yugoslavia, in 1934, the separate discipline of ski flying was introduced, which is essentially an 'extreme' version of ski jumping.

With one exception, all of the world records for distance have been set on five of the world's six ski flying hills, of which five remain in use. The FIS was long opposed to ski flying as a whole, and it has never been included in the Olympic or Nordic World Ski Championships. However, since 1972, the FIS Ski Flying World Championships has been a mainstay event, and ski flying event are also part of the FIS Ski Jumping World Cup calendar.

The distance of a ski jump is measured from the end of the 'table' (the very tip of the 'inrun' ramp) to halfway between the athletes' feet when they touch ground. To qualify, the jump must be made in a sanctioned competition, or official trial or qualification runs for these, with a system to control the actual length. To win a competition, an athlete needs both distance and style, the latter of which is achieved by attaining a proper Telemark landing; therefore jumpers are not motivated to jump as far as possible, only as far necessary to attain a good landing. Jumps are invalid if the jumper falls, defined as touching the ground with his hands or body before reaching the fall line. However, if an athlete touches the snow with any part of their body after landing, and receives style points greater than 14 from at least three judges, the jump is valid and counts as an official world record.

When ski flying began in the 1930s, jumps were recorded in a traditional Scandinavian measure of length, the Norwegian alen (1 alen (Norway) = ). Some older United States and Canadian records were recorded in feet. Now, jump length is measured by the meter. Today, camera technology capably makes the measurements. Before, spectators were stationed downhill, meter by meter, and the raised hand of the nearest observer marked the jumper's landing.

Men

Official world records 
Progress of all valid world records by fully standing on both feet, although International Ski Federation doesn't recognize them.

Also distances set by test and trial jumpers during competition rounds are deemed official.

Invalid world record distances 
Not counting if touching the ground, falling before reaching the outrun line or landing during non-competition training rounds.

Falsely claimed world records 
Those jumps were never actually world record distances, false claimed by some stats and media:

1886  — Johannes Nordgården didn't set standing WR at 26 metres, but actually crashed at 27 metres WR distance on 24 February on Flatdalbakken in Seljord. However, Olaf Berland stood at 25.5 m, which was almost certainly a WR back then.
1892 – 30 metres by Gustav Bye from Norway set in Blyberget, Trondheim on 11 March was never a WR. Some statistics made false claims it was in 1890, which would then actually be a world record. After this jump, anonymous reader "F2", most likely it was Fritz Huitsfeldt, the secretary of Ski Association in Oslo, wrote an open letter in Aftenposten, accusing organizers in Trondheim that they cheated at distance measuring. He got their quick response in Aftenposten on his false allegations.
1913 – 48 metres by Thorleif Knudsen set on Bolgenschanze at 2 March, was never a WR. Europeans then didn't believe (acknowledge) world records on North American, as two weeks earlier Ragnar Omtvedt set WR at 51.5 metres (169 ft).
1914 — 48.5 metres set by Norwegians Josef Henriksen and Fridolf Aas on 1 February at Gustadbakken, were never WRs. Europeans then didn't believe (acknowledge) reports from America, that year before Ragnar Omtvedt set WR at 51.5 m (169 ft).
1918 — claimed 62.2 metres (204 ft) by Henry Hall set on 22 February is false, as no world record was set that year at Steamboat Springs. The longest jump that year was set on Friday by Anders Haugen at 191 feet (58.2 metres).
1931 — Alf Engen's 231 feet (70.4 m) set on Ecker Hill on 1 January was never really WR, because Americans recognized only their records (229 ft by R. Omtdvedt). But Badrutt made 246 ft already in 1930 and Nelsen (240 ft) in 1925.
1931 — Alf Engen's 243 feet (74 m) set on Ecker Hill on 1 February was never really WR, because Americans recognized only their records (229 ft by R. Omtdvedt). But Badrutt made 246 ft already in 1930 and Nelsen (240 ft) in 1925.
1933 — Alf Engen's 281 ft (85.6 metres) set on 26 February on Ecker Hill was never WR, recognized only in America. Henri Ruchet jumped 285 ft on the same day before him and Sigmund Ruud landed at 282 ft a week earlier, both set in Villars.
1941 — All three jumps on 2 March in Planica in this chronological order; Lahr (111 m), Krauß (112 m) and Mair (109 m with touch) were false claimed as world records. They all performed only after Gering set WR at 118 metres, as described in Jutro.
1991 — There have been many rumors and false speculations over the years, that Ralph Gebstedt tied 194 metres world record on 23 March in Planica. But in fact, he only set his personal best at 190 metres.

Number of all 109 official world records by hills

Women

Summer world records 
Plastic matting for ski jumping was invented by German athlete Hans Renner. The first ski jumping tests on plastic without any audience were made on 31 October 1954 at Regenbergschanze in Zella-Mehlis, East Germany.

At the Wadeberg Jugendschanze K40 in Oberhof, East Germany, which was built just next to the old .

Valid

Invalid

All jumps over 250 metres
As of 24 March 2019

Most jumps over 250 metres
As of 24 March 2019, including invalid jumps:

All female jumps over 200 metres
As of 19 March 2023

Most female jumps over 200 metres
As of 19 March 2023, including test jump:

Note

References

External links
List of official ski flying world records at skisprungschanzen.com

Ski jumping-related lists
Ski flying
Ski jumps
Ski jumps